Saravarsham is a 1982 Malayalam drama film starring Sukumaran, Zarina Wahab, Mammootty and Sathyakala.

Plot
Sumesh is the only child of his parents. He is living in constant depression after knowing that he is impotent and cannot have children. Adding to his depression, his wife is an alcoholic and leads a troubled life. One day Sumesh learns that his father has a daughter in an illegitimate relationship. His half-sister Savitha happens to be his friend's wife and Sumesh becomes so close to her family considering that her son would be his only legal heir. But Savitha's husband Rajashekharan starts suspecting his wife about the relationship with Sumesh. He discovers the truth only after it is too late.

Cast
 Sukumaran as Dr. K. Sumesh
 Zarina Wahab as Savitha
 Mammootty as Rajashekharan
 Sathyakala as Sumathi
 Bahadur as Ravunni Nair
 Jagannatha Varma as Meleppattu Ramakrishnan Nair
 Kailas Nath as Dr. Varma
 Santhakumari as Lakshmi Amma
 Jose Prakash as Sumathi's father
Prathapachandran as Savitha's father
 T. R. Omana as Devakiyamma
 Meena as Savitha's mother

Soundtrack
The music was composed by Shyam and the lyrics were written by Poovachal Khader.

References

External links

view the film
 saravarsham

1980s Malayalam-language films
1982 drama films
1982 films
Films directed by Baby (director)